Kurfürstendamm is a 1920 German silent drama film directed by Richard Oswald and starring Conrad Veidt, Asta Nielsen, and Erna Morena. It is set on the Kurfürstendamm in central Berlin. It is now considered a lost film.

The film's sets were designed by the art director Hans Dreier. Director Oswald made this film the year after he made Weird Tales (1919), which also had starred Conrad Veidt. Cinematographer Carl Hoffmann went on to lens Der Januskopf (1920) and Dr. Mabuse, the Gambler (1922).

Plot
Satan (Veidt) notices that a lot of souls entering Hell from Berlin have been coming in from the city's Kurfurstendamm district. He goes there and rents an apartment, disguised as a businessman. A doctor named Li (Henry Sze) takes him on a guided tour of the neighborhood's dens of sin. After he is beaten and robbed on the street, the Devil flees back to Hell where he feels much safer.

Cast
 Conrad Veidt as Satan
 Asta Nielsen as Girl Lissy / Mulattin / Filmstar / Koechin Maria
 Erna Morena as Frau von Alady
 Henry Sze as Dr. Li
 Rosa Valetti as Frau Lesser
 Paul Morgan as Fritz
 Rudolf Forster as Ernst Duffer
 Theodor Loos as Raoul Hasenzwing

References

Bibliography

External links

1920 films
Films of the Weimar Republic
German silent feature films
German drama films
Films directed by Richard Oswald
1920 drama films
German black-and-white films
Films set in Berlin
Lost German films
The Devil in film
Silent drama films
Silent horror films
1920s German films